Petr Lakomý (born 10 April 1951) is a Czech rower. He competed in the men's coxless pair event at the 1972 Summer Olympics.

References

1951 births
Living people
Czech male rowers
Olympic rowers of Czechoslovakia
Rowers at the 1972 Summer Olympics
Sportspeople from Olomouc